Luke F. Cozans (March 15, 1836 in Prince Edward Island, Canada – April 7, 1903 in Manhattan, New York City) was an American lawyer and politician from New York.

Life
He was the son of John Cozans and Mary (Comerford) Cozans (c.1796–1860). The family removed to New York City in 1839. He studied law with Ogden Hoffman, was admitted to the bar in 1857, and practiced in New York City.

He was a member of the New York State Assembly (New York Co., 10th D.) in 1861; of the New York State Senate (5th D.) in 1864 and 1865; and again of the State Assembly (14th D.) in 1877. He was the Democratic candidate for Speaker in 1877, but was defeated by Republican George B. Sloan.

He died of "kidney trouble" at his home at 2016 Fifth Avenue, in Manhattan, and was buried in White Plains.

Sources
 The New York Civil List compiled by Franklin Benjamin Hough, Stephen C. Hutchins and Edgar Albert Werner (1870; pg. 443 and 494)
 Biographical Sketches of the State Officers and Members of the Legislature of the State of New York in 1861 by William D. Murphy (pg. 179f)
 The Legislature in The Madison Observer on January 10, 1877
 DEATH LIST OF A DAY; Luke F. Cozans in NYT on April 8, 1903

1836 births
1903 deaths
Democratic Party New York (state) state senators
People from Harlem
Democratic Party members of the New York State Assembly
People from Prince Edward Island
19th-century American politicians